The Formula Sun Grand Prix (FSGP) is an annual solar-car race that takes place on closed-loop race tracks. In the race, teams from colleges and universities throughout North America design, build, test, and race solar-powered vehicles.

Every two years the race serves as a qualifier for the American Solar Challenge road race.

FSGP 2017 took place between July 6 and 8 at Circuit of the Americas in Austin, Texas.

Format and organization

Rules
 The race consists of three days of freely driving laps around the race track.
 The team with the most total laps driven wins.
 The total area of all solar cells and related reflectors, etc., must not exceed six-square meters.
 The solar array may be reoriented toward the sun for charging batteries for specified time periods before and after race hours.
 Strict specifications and engineering scrutiny process is provided for vehicle configuration, safety requirements, and other standards.
 Previous races have divided teams into "open" and "stock" classes based on levels of solar cell and battery technologies.

History
Formula Sun Grand Prix is governed by the Innovators Educational Foundation, and was started in summer 2000 at Heartland Park race track in Topeka, Kansas, in conjunction with a solar-bike race.

It has served as a qualifying race for the biennial American Solar Challenge road race.

The race was held there every year through 2005 until the 2007 American Solar Challenge was canceled due to funding issues. It resumed in 2009 and has been held every year since then at a few different venues.

2000
The inaugural race was held at Heartland Park Topeka race track in Topeka, Kansas. It was won by Rose-Hulman Institute of Technology's Solar Phantom V. The stock class was won by the University of Missouri-Rolla's Solar Miner II.

2001
FSGP 2001 served as a qualifier for the 2001 American Solar Challenge and was the only year when multiple events were held.

 The first event was again held at Heartland Park Topeka and the Rose-Hulman again took first place overall with Solar Phantom VI, while the stock class was won by the co-op team from Minnesota State University, Mankato and Winona State University.

 The second event was held at Gingerman Raceway in South Haven, Michigan, and was won by Principia College's RA IV, while the stock class was won by Stanford University.

2002
FSGP 2002 was held at Heartland Park Topeka and was won by the University of Missouri-Rolla's Solar Miner III, while the stock class was won by Kansas State University.

2003
FSGP 2003 was held at Heartland Park Topeka and served as a qualifier for the 2003 American Solar Challenge. It was won by the University of Minnesota's Borealis II, while Kansas State finished just one lap behind in second place. The stock class was won by North Dakota State University.

2004
FSGP 2004 was held at Heartland Park Topeka and the University of Missouri-Rolla's Solar Miner IV took first place overall.

2005
FSGP 2005 was held at Heartland Park Topeka and served as a qualifier for the 2005 North American Solar Challenge. It was won by Minnesota's Borealis III.

2009
After a three-year hiatus due to a lack of funding, FSGP 2009 was held at MotorSport Ranch in Cresson, Texas. The University of Minnesota's Centaurus took first place overall.

2010
FSGP 2010 was again held at the MotorSport Ranch Cresson and served as a qualifier for the 2010 American Solar Challenge. It was won by the University of Michigan.

2011
FSGP 2011 was held at the Indianapolis Motor Speedway in Indianapolis, Indiana, as part of the Indianapolis 500's 100th-anniversary celebrations. Minnesota's Centaurus II took first place overall.

2012
FSGP 2012 was held at the Monticello Motor Club in Monticello, New York, and served as a qualifier for the 2012 American Solar Challenge. It was won by Michigan.

2013
FSGP 2013 was held at Circuit of the Americas in Austin, Texas. Oregon State University's Phoenix took first place overall, while Illinois State University's Mercury IV finished one lap behind in second place, and Iowa State University's Hyperion finished one lap behind them in third place.

2014
FSGP 2014 was again held at Circuit of the Americas and served as a qualifier for the 2014 American Solar Challenge. It was won by Michigan. The race was marred by an electrical fire in a garage causing many team's cars and equipment to be damaged by water from the complex's sprinkler system.

2015
FSGP 2015 was held again at Circuit of the Americas on July 29–31. It was won by Iowa State University with 223 total laps and a fast lap of 4:30.444, both track records for solar cars. Hot weather forced most of the teams to have to pull into the pits at times to cool their batteries. The University of Calgary became the first Cruiser team to compete in FSGP.

* Teams with a Cruiser Class vehicle tied below the next conventional team.

2016
FSGP 2016 took place at Pitt Race in Wampum, Pennsylvania on July 26–28, 2016. It served as a qualifier for the 2016 American Solar Challenge. It was won by Michigan.

2017
FSGP 2017 was held again at Circuit of the Americas on July 6–8. It was won by the CalSol team of UC Berkeley with 228 total laps.

2018
FSGP 2018 was held at Motorsports Park Hastings in Hastings, Nebraska on July 10–12. This year featured the first ever Multi-Occupant Vehicle (MOV) class at FSGP, which was won by University of Minnesota with triple the score of the runner-up, setting a record as the first team to win FSGP 5 times. The Single-Occupant Vehicle (SOV) class was won by Polytechnique Montreal with 403 laps.

2019
FSGP 2019 was held at Circuit of the Americas in Austin, Texas on July 4–6. The Multi-Occupant Vehicle (MOV) class was won by University of Calgary with a Score of 24.188. The Single-Occupant Vehicle (SOV) class was won by Polytechnique Montreal with 230 laps.

2020
FSGP 2020 was planned to return to Heartland Park Topeka on July 10-16, 2020, but was postponed to September and ultimately cancelled due to the COVID-19 pandemic.

2021 
FSGP 2021 was held at Heartland Park Topeka on July 30-August 1, 2021. The Multi-Occupant Vehicle (MOV) class was won by University of Minnesota with a Score of 26.873. The Single-Occupant Vehicle (SOV) class was won by the University of Kentucky with 250 laps.

See also

 List of solar car teams
 List of prototype solar-powered cars

Other solar vehicle challenges
 American Solar Challenge
 The Solar Car Challenge, an annual event for high school students from the U.S. and (to a lesser extent) other parts of the world; first held in 1995
 South African Solar Challenge, a South African biennial event; first held in 2008
 World Solar Challenge, an Australian biennial world championship solar car race

References

External links
 , the official website of the Formula Sun Grand Prix

2000 establishments in Kansas
Annual sporting events in the United States
Auto races in the United States
Photovoltaics
Recurring sporting events established in 2000
Solar car races
Solar energy in the United States